Upsilon Draconis (υ Dra) is a binary star system in the northern circumpolar constellation of Draco. It is faintly visible to the naked eye with an apparent visual magnitude of 4.83. Based upon an annual parallax shift of 9.48 mas as measured from Earth, it is located around 340 light years from the Sun. At that distance, the visual magnitude of the star is diminished by an extinction factor of 0.02 due to interstellar dust.

This is a single-lined spectroscopic binary star system with an orbital period of 258.48 days and an eccentricity of 0.21. The primary, component A, is an evolved K-type giant star with a stellar classification of  K0 III. It is a suspected barium star, which may indicate the orbiting companion, component B, is a white dwarf star.

At the estimated distance of Upsilon Draconis, this yields a physical size of about 19 times the Sun's radius. It is about 1.37 billion years old with an estimated 2.05 times the mass of the Sun. The star is radiating 2.23 times the solar luminosity from its photosphere at an effective temperature of 4,561 K.

References

 

K-type giants
Barium stars
Draco (constellation)
Draconis, Upsilon
Durchmusterung objects
Draconis, 52
176524
092782
7180
Spectroscopic binaries